Queenie Chan is a Chinese-Australian Original English-Language comic artist who co-wrote and illustrated the graphic novel In Odd We Trust, a prequel to Dean Koontz's Odd Thomas, and published by Del Rey. She illustrated the sequel, Odd Is On Our Side, and is illustrating The Boy's Book of Positive Quotations for Fairview Press.

Background and early career
She originally lived in Hong Kong, but in 1986, she and her family moved to Australia. Through her childhood, she was interested in reading manga and also read Chinese-translated versions of Shonen Jump as well as popular American cartoon strips such as Garfield and Calvin and Hobbes.

She attended Meriden High School before graduating and enrolling at the University of New South Wales (UNSW) to study computer programming, but in mid-1998, she was inspired to write and draw her own manga stories after reading Rurouni Kenshin.

Career
Queenie Chan started publishing her own web comics before she considered submitting her work to Tokyopop in 2005, where she successfully published her three volume series The Dreaming.

Bill Sherman, reviewing Chan's work on The Dreaming praised her work stating she was a "skillful visual storyteller, capable of slathering on the atmosphere".

Selected bibliography

Published works
 The Dreaming (2005–2007)
 In Odd We Trust (2008)
 Odd Is On Our Side (2010)
 The Boy's Book of Positive Quotations (Illustrator) (2009)
 Small Shen (2012) (Art work by Queenie Chan, story by Kylie Chan)

One-shot manga
 A Chinese Ghost Story
 Twinside
 Block 6

Short stories
 Only Flora
 Keeper of the Soul
 Message To You
 The Two Dollar Deal
 Ten Years Ago Today
 Blood of Snow
 Yuen
 A Girl Called Marian
 Greenhouse
 A Short Ghost Story
 Twins
 Air+Space
 Shirley's Story
 Twinside
 Block 6
 A Chinese Ghost Story

References

External links
 Queenie Chan Website
 An interview with Queenie Chan conducted at Silverbulletcomicbooks.com
 

Australian comics artists
Chinese comics artists
Living people
University of New South Wales alumni
Australian women artists
Emigrants from British Hong Kong to Australia
1980 births
Australian female comics artists
Chinese female comics artists